Government House of Prince Edward Island, often referred to as Fanningbank, is the official residence of the lieutenant governor of Prince Edward Island, as well as that in Charlottetown of the Canadian monarch. It stands in the provincial capital at 1 Terry Fox Drive; while the equivalent building in many provinces has a prominent, central place in the capital, the site of Prince Edward Island's Government House is relatively unobtrusive within Charlottetown, giving it more the character of a private home.

History

Government House was constructed between 1832 and 1834 as a viceregal residence for the lieutenant governor of the then British colony of Prince Edward Island. The land, a parcel of  known as Fanning Bank or Fanning's Bank, was in 1789 set aside by Lieutenant Governor Edmund Fanning as Crown land, with the specific stipulation that it be used as the site for the governor's residence.

Government House was designated a National Historic Site of Canada in 1971.

Use
Government House is where members of the Canadian Royal Family and visiting foreign dignitaries are greeted and often stay while in Charlottetown. It is also where numerous royal and viceroyal events take place, such as the bestowing of provincial awards or inductions into the Order of Prince Edward Island, as well as luncheons, dinners, receptions, and speaking engagements. It is also at the royal residence that the lieutenant governor will drop the writs of election, swear-in new members of the Executive Council, and hold audience with her premier.

The property is owned by the King in Right of Prince Edward Island and is open to the public for certain periods during the summer.

Architecture and interiors
The wood-frame building's architectural design is Georgian with echoes of the Palladian tradition. The two axis of the house converge on the main entrance hall, which has doric columns and pilasters and a double switchback stair leading to the second floor. The residence was designed by Yorkshire architect Isaac Smith, who also designed the Island's Colonial Building.

See also
 Government Houses in Canada
 Government Houses of the British Empire

References

Prince Edward Island
Buildings and structures in Charlottetown
National Historic Sites in Prince Edward Island
Houses completed in 1834
Georgian architecture in Canada